Charles W. Flanagan High School is a public high school in Pembroke Pines, Florida, United States. Opened in 1996, it was the first public high school there. Flanagan's enrollment is just under 2600.

Flanagan has a Florida Comprehensive Assessment Test (FSA) school grade of "A" for the 2016–2017 academic year.

History
The school was named after Charles W. Flanagan, a previous Pembroke Pines mayor.

The school mascot is a Falcon.

Notable alumni

Nick Turnbull, Former NFL player for Atlanta Falcons, Chicago Bears, Cincinnati Bengals.
Bridget Carey, CNET Senior Editor
Cary Williams, attended the school for two years - Cornerback, Tennessee Titans, Baltimore Ravensall, Philadelphia Eagles, Seattle Seahawks  
Conroy Black, attended the school for two years - Cornerback, Oakland Raiders, Detroit Lions, Kansas City Chiefs. Named one of the fastest football players in the nation on the annual Heisman Pundit list.
Conceited, battle rapper and Wild 'N Out cast member
J. D. Martinez, outfielder for the Boston Red Sox
Mike Napoli, first baseman who is currently a free agent
Jim Alers, Professional Mixed Martial Arts fighter for the Ultimate Fighting Championship
Alia Atkinson,  Olympic swimmer representing Jamaica and two time world record holder.
Robert Love, author and Director of Engineering at Google
Ramiele Malubay, American Idol contestant, 2007
Eric Alejandro, representing Puerto Rico in the 2012 Olympics
Riley Reid, pornographic actress
Devin Bush, Former University Of Michigan linebacker, current NFL player for the Pittsburgh Steelers
Josh Metellus, football player
Stanford Samuels III, football player
Lil Pump, rapper

References

External links
 

Broward County Public Schools
Educational institutions established in 1996
High schools in Broward County, Florida
Public high schools in Florida
Pembroke Pines, Florida
1996 establishments in Florida